Lathrapanteles is a genus of braconid wasps in the family Braconidae. There are at least four described species in Lathrapanteles, found in the New World.

Species
These four species belong to the genus Lathrapanteles:
 Lathrapanteles ampyx Williams, 1985
 Lathrapanteles fuscus Williams, 1985
 Lathrapanteles heleios Williams, 1985
 Lathrapanteles papaipemae (Muesebeck, 1921)

References

Further reading

 
 
 

Microgastrinae